Willie Hans Karsten Hoel (16 June 1920 – 15 June 1986) was a Norwegian actor and comedian.

He is best known for on-stage performances and for numerous roles, mainly comedic, in Norwegian movies, including the Olsenbanden movies.

References

1920 births
1986 deaths
Male actors from Oslo
Norwegian male film actors
Norwegian male comedians
Norwegian male stage actors
20th-century Norwegian male actors
20th-century comedians